LAPA may stand for:

 Líneas Aéreas Privadas Argentinas
 Local Adaptation Plans of Action